Richard Barter may refer to:
 Richard Barter (physician) (1802–1870), Irish physician and proponent of hydropathy
 Richard H. Barter (1833–1859), Canadian-born outlaw during the California Gold Rush
 Richard Barter (sculptor) (1824–1896), Irish sculptor